WWE Madison Square Garden Classics is a professional wrestling television program on the MSG Network, produced by World Wrestling Entertainment. It debuted in a two-hour block on July 12, 2006 and was hosted by longtime wrestling announcer "Mean" Gene Okerlund, primarily recapping and reairing WWF on MSG Network shows throughout the 1980s and early 1990s.

History
On July 12, 2006, WWE programming returned to MSG Network for the first time since March 16, 1997. Two back to back episodes of MSG Classics air every Wednesday night. Each hour shows highlights of a WWF house show that took place at Madison Square Garden, originally telecast live on the network in the 1980s and 1990s.

Also featured are past episodes of Raw from the Garden, although only three such episodes to date have aired; on July 26, 2006, the very first Raw to take place at the Garden in September 1997; another featuring a past episode of Raw from MSG that took place in September 2002 aired on September 13, 2006; and a third with Raw from June 23, 2003 aired on September 5, 2007. Finally, the SummerSlam 1988 and SummerSlam 1991 pay-per-views along with "The War to Settle the Score" and "The Brawl to End it All" specials have also been shown. The show's run ended in 2008 but episodes 67-74 were rerun four times each from April 29, 2009 to August 26, 2009.

Episode list

See also
 WWF on MSG Network
 MSG Network
 World Wrestling Entertainment

References

External links
 

2006 American television series debuts
Television series by WWE
MSG Network original programming